Jurgi Oteo Gómez (born 29 August 1996) is a Spanish professional footballer who plays for Arenas Club de Getxo as a right winger.

Club career
Born in Barakaldo, Biscay, Basque Country, Arias graduated with Athletic Bilbao's youth setup, after a spell at Santutxu FC. He made his debut as a senior with the farm team in the 2013–14 campaign, in Tercera División.

On 12 July 2001, Oteo was promoted to the reserves in Segunda División B. He appeared in 29 matches and scored two goals during the season, as the B-side returned to Segunda División after a 19-year absence.

Oteo made his professional debut on 24 August 2015, starting in a 0–1 home loss against Girona FC. The season ended in relegation, and Oteo remained with the reserve squad for the following campaign, becoming a more regular starter (22 matches, compared with 4 the previous year). 

In July 2017, Oteo signed for hometown club Barakaldo CF, also in the third tier. Athletic Bilbao retained an option to sign him back, and although they did not initially exercise this clause, in June 2018 Oteo joined Athletic again after a season playing regularly for Baraka. However, following months of infrequent action for Bilbao Athletic he was loaned back to Barakaldo until the end of the 2018–19 season.

On 4 August 2020, after contributing rarely in CE Sabadell FC's promotion campaign, Oteo rejoined Barakaldo. In February 2021 his contract was terminated and he signed for Arenas Club de Getxo.

References

External links

1996 births
Living people
Spanish footballers
Footballers from Barakaldo
Association football wingers
Segunda División players
Segunda División B players
Tercera División players
Segunda Federación players
CD Basconia footballers
Bilbao Athletic footballers
Barakaldo CF footballers
CE Sabadell FC footballers
Spain youth international footballers
Athletic Bilbao footballers
Arenas Club de Getxo footballers
Santutxu FC players